Thein Daw Gyi Pagoda is a Buddhist pagoda in Myeik, Tanintharyi Region, Myanmar. The pagoda is the largest pagoda in Myeik and is a popular tourist attraction. Thein Daw Gyi pagoda was situated over (280) years since Myanmar year (1093). We can play the historical Thailand pagoda, Buddha culture museum, Buddha Library and preach abode. And then we can enjoy sunset, natural overview of Myeik and we can play Marhar Atula Yanthi from Thein Daw Gyi Pagoda. The pagoda was built between 1772 and 1778.

References 

Pagodas in Myanmar